Wesley Newcomb Hohfeld (August 9, 1879, Oakland, CaliforniaOctober 21, 1918, Alameda, California) was an American jurist. He was the author of the seminal Fundamental Legal Conceptions as Applied in Judicial Reasoning and Other Legal Essays (1919).

During his life he published only a handful of law journal articles. After his death the material forming the basis of Fundamental Legal Conceptions was derived from two articles in the Yale Law Journal (1913) and (1917) that had been partially revised with a view to publication. Editorial work was undertaken to complete the revisions and the book was published with the inclusion of the manuscript notes that Hohfeld had left, plus seven other essays.

The work remains a powerful contribution to modern understanding of the nature of rights and the implications of liberty. To reflect Hohfeld's continuing importance, a chair at Yale University is named after him.  The chair is currently occupied by Gideon Yaffe as of 2019 and was last held by Jules Coleman, who retired in 2012.

Career
Wesley Newcomb Hohfeld was born in California in 1879.  He graduated from the University of California, Berkeley in 1901.  He went on to Harvard Law School, where he served as editor of the Harvard Law Review, and graduated in 1904 with honors.

From 1905 to 1914 Hohfeld taught at Stanford Law School.  He then moved to Yale Law School, where he taught until his death in 1918.

Hohfeld as professor of jurisprudence
Jurisprudence is the branch of philosophy which deals with principles of law and the legal systems through which the law is applied. Hohfeld's contribution was to simplify; he created a very precise analysis which distinguished between fundamental legal concepts and then identified the framework of relationships between them. His work offers a sophisticated method for deconstructing broad legal principles into their component elements.  By showing how legal relationships are connected to each other, the resulting analysis illuminates policy implications and identifies the issues which arise in practical decision making.

Hohfeldian analysis

Overview
Hohfeld noticed that even respected jurists conflate various meanings of the term right, sometimes switching senses of the word several times in a single sentence. He wrote that such imprecision of language indicated a concomitant imprecision of thought, and thus also of the resulting legal conclusions. In order to both facilitate reasoning and clarify rulings, he attempted to disambiguate the term rights by breaking it into eight distinct concepts. To eliminate ambiguity, he defined these terms relative to one another, grouping them into four pairs of Jural Opposites and four pairs of Jural Correlatives.

This use of the words right and privilege correspond respectively to the concepts of claim rights and liberty rights.

Hohfeld argued that right and duty are correlative concepts, i.e. the one must always be matched by a claim about the other. If A has a right against B, this is equivalent to B having a duty to honor A's right. If B has no duty, that means that B has a privilege, i.e. B can do whatever he or she pleases because B has no duty to refrain from doing it. Each individual is located within a matrix of relationships with other individuals. By summing the rights held and duties owed across all these relationships, the analyst can identify both the degree of liberty — A would have perfect liberty if A has no duty to refrain from acting and others have a duty never to interfere with A's actions — and whether the concept of liberty is comprised by commonly followed practices, thereby establishing general moral principles and civil rights.

Examples of Hohfeldian analysis
Hohfeld defines the correlatives in terms of the relationships between two individuals. In the theory of "in rem rights", there is a direct relationship between a person and a thing. Real rights are in this respect unlike claim rights or "rights in personam", which by nature must be exercised against a person, the best example being when someone is owed money by another. Hohfeld demonstrates that this way of understanding rights in general is wrong. In particular, Hohfeld demonstrates that there is no such thing as a legal relation between a person and a thing, since a legal relation always operates between two people. As the legal relations between any two people are complex, it is helpful to break them down into their simplest forms. Legal rights do not correspond to single Hohfeldian relations, but are compounds of them. A right can be defined as an aggregate of the Hohfeldian relations with other people.

Hohfeld replaces the concept of "right in personam" by "paucital right" and "right in rem" by a compound or aggregate of "multital rights". Rights held by a person against one or a few definite persons are paucital (or "in personam"), and rights held by a person against a large indefinite class of people are multital (or "in rem"). A contract right is paucital (or "in personam") because it can be enforced only against the specific parties to the contract. A property right is multital (or "in rem") because a landowner has the right to exclude not only specific people from his land but the "whole world". The landowner has many rights, privileges, powers, and immunities; his multital rights are composed of many paucital rights. For example, the owner has a right that others do not step on his land but there is not just one such right against a mass of persons (the community), but many separate although usually identical paucital rights with this content (as many instances as there are people in the community). This is what Hohfeld calls "multital" rights.

Consider also the definition of liberty. In Hohfeldian analysis, liberty is defined by an absence both of a duty and of a right. B is free because he has no duty to refrain from acting and because A has no right that he not act. That does not deny that B might decide to do what A wants because that is the essence of liberty. Nor does it deny the possibility that B might accept a duty to A to give a benefit to C. In that situation, C would have no right and would have to rely on A to enforce the duty. The truth is that liberty is significant from both a legal and a moral point of view because only liberty ensures that an individual has control over his or her choices on whether and how to act. If something interferes with this choice, the natural reaction is to resent it and to seek a remedy. The correlative between right and duty inevitably describes the way in which two people are limited in their choices to act, and the outside observer cannot capture the legal and moral implications without examining the nature of the right held by A. Hence, this relationship is qualitatively different. An interference with liberty would be considered wrongful without having to ask for detailed evidence. Yet whether A's relationship with B is morally suspect could only be determined by evaluating evidence on precisely what B's duty requires B to do or not to do.

See also
Civil rights
Claim rights and liberty rights
Private property
Property

References

Further reading
 American Law Institute.  Restatement of the Law of Property. St. Paul: American Law Institute Publishers (1936). Review
 
 Cook, Walter Wheeler. "Hohfeld's Contribution to the Science of Law," 28 Yale Law Journal 721 (1918).
 Corbin, Arthur. "Legal Analysis and Terminology", 29 Yale Law Journal 163 (1919).
 Cullison, Allen. "A Review of Hohfeld's Fundamental Legal Concepts", 16 Cleveland-Marshall Law Review 559 (1967).
 Hohfeld, Wesley Newcomb. Fundamental Legal Conceptions as Applied in Judicial Reasoning, Yale University Press (1946).  The article appeared earlier at 26 Yale Law Journal 710 (1917).
 Hohfeld, Wesley. Fundamental Legal Conceptions.  Arthur Corbin, ed. (Westport, Conn., Greenwood Press (1978)
Hohfeld, Wesley. "Some Fundamental Legal Conceptions as Applied in Legal Reasoning," 23 Yale Law Journal 16 (1913).
 Nyquist, Curtis. Teaching Wesley Hohfeld's Theory of Legal Relations, 52 Journal of Legal Education 238 (2002). 
 Perry, Thomas. "A Paradigm of Philosophy: Hohfeld on Legal Rights", 14 American Philosophical Quarterly 41 (January 1977).
 Perry, Thomas. "Reply in Defense of Hohfeld," 37 Philosophical Studies 203 (1980).
 Schlag, Pierre. "How to Do Things With Hohfeld," 78 Law and Contemporary Problems 185 (2015).
 Singer, Joseph William. The Legal Rights Debate in Analytical Jurisprudence from Bentham to Hohfeld, 1982 Wisconsin Law Review 975.
.

External links
Hohfeld, Wesley Newcomb & Cook, Walter Wheeler (ed.): Fundamental Legal Conceptions as Applied in Judicial Reasoning and Other Legal Essays (Yale University Press, 1919) at Archive.org
Hohfeld, Wesley Newcomb: Some Fundamental Legal Conceptions as Applied in Judicial Reasoning, 23 Yale Law Journal 16 (1913) at HIIT.fi
Taking the Right Seriously: Hohfeldian Semiotics and Rights Discourse

1879 births
1918 deaths
American legal scholars
Philosophers of law
Philosophy of law
Harvard Law School alumni
University of California, Berkeley alumni